Rafał Sikora (born February 17, 1987 in Mielec) is a Polish race walker.

He represented his country at the 2012 Olympic Games in London finishing 18th.

Competition record

Personal bests
Outdoor
5000 m walk – 19:38.03 (Katowice 2011)
10,000 m walk – 40:30.80 (Warsaw 2010)
10 km walk – 41:49 (Kraków 2010)
20 km walk – 1:21:04 (Zaniemyśl 2011)
50 km walk – 3:46:16 (Dudince 2011)

Indoor
5000 m walk – 19:22.15 (Spała 2012)

External links
 

1987 births
Living people
Polish male racewalkers
Athletes (track and field) at the 2012 Summer Olympics
People from Mielec
Sportspeople from Podkarpackie Voivodeship
Olympic athletes of Poland